N. K. Premachandran (born 25 May 1960) is an Indian politician. He is presently the Member of Parliament from Kollam Lok Sabha constituency. He was the former minister for Water Resources in the Government of Kerala and was responsible for irrigation, ground water development, water supply and sanitation. He was a member of both houses of the Parliament of India (Lok Sabha and Rajya Sabha). He is known for his public speeches. Premachandran has written a book Oh Iraq based on his travel experience to Iraq. He was instrumental in taking up the issue of the safety of Mullaperiyar Dam.

He initiated a number of innovative steps in drinking water sector. He began the consultancy wing of Kerala Water Authority called Wascon and mooted the bottled water plant and pipe factory.

Education
He completed BSc from Fathima Matha National College, Kollam. He passed LLB from Government Law College, Thiruvananthapuram with record marks and with first rank in 1985.

Political History 
N. K. Premachandran is currently the Central Secretariat Member of the Revolutionary Socialist Party. He started his political career through the student organisation of Revolutionary Socialist Party. During his political career he held various positions at both state and national level.

He was elected as Member of the Navaikulam Grama Panchayat between 1987 and 1995. He was elected as a Member of District Panchayat in 1995. He was elected to Lok Sabha for the first time in 1996 and thereafter in 1998 and 2014 from Kollam Constituency. He was elected to Rajya Sabha in 2000. He was elected to Kerala Legislative Assembly from Chavara assembly constituency in Kollam district and became a Minister for Water Resources during 2006–2011. He is a Parliamentarian and orator.

In the 2019 Indian general election he won from the Kollam with a record margin of 1.5 lakh votes. He introduced a private member bill overturning Sabarimala verdict and it was the first private bill introduced in 17th Lok Sabha.

References

Living people
Malayali politicians
1960 births
India MPs 1996–1997
India MPs 1998–1999
Lok Sabha members from Kerala
Rajya Sabha members from Kerala
India MPs 2014–2019
India MPs 2019–present
Revolutionary Socialist Party (India) politicians
Government Law College, Thiruvananthapuram alumni